Holy Records is a French metal label run by Misanthrope frontman Phillipe De L'Argilière. Aside from Misanthrope itself, the label has not signed many French bands, but also corresponds with several Greek bands.

Current and former artists
Source:

Am'ganesha'n
Argile
Balrog
Chaostar
Division Alpha
Elend
Exhumation
Frozen Shadows
Garwall
Gloomy Grim
Godsend
Hantaoma
Hectic Patterns
Inactive Messiah
Kadenzza
Legenda
Misanthrope
Mistaken Element
Natron
Nightfall
Ominous
On Thorns I Lay
Orakle
Orphaned Land
Rajna
Septic Flesh
Serenity
Soulgrind
Stille Volk
S.U.P
Trepalium
Tristitia
Ufych Sormeer
Yearning

References

Heavy metal record labels
French record labels
Music publishing companies of France
Death metal record labels
Doom metal record labels